The Samsung SCH-U460 is a side-slider text messaging mobile phone. It was released July 29, 2010 to Verizon Wireless.
There is also a newer model of this phone named the Samsung Intensity 3 (SCH-U485). It is the current model of the series.

Features
The SCH-U460 features include: a QWERTY keyboard, Bluetooth, MP3 player, SMS, and a 1.3 MP camera, Mobile instant messaging (IM) and emailing. It does not have a video camera. The phone also has a Micro SD card slot that is accessible on the side. The phone also has a USB port on its side that was able to be used with the charger that is featured with the phone.

References

External links
 Official Page
 Samsung Intensity (U460) Review Phone Arena
 Samsung Intensity II Review (CNET)

SCH-u460
Mobile phones introduced in 2010